Kyle Martin (born 17 September 1990) is an Australian rules football player who was recruited by the Collingwood Football Club of the Australian Football League (AFL) with draft pick #13 in the 2013 Rookie Draft after winning the 2012 best & fairest award for Frankston in the Victorian Football League (VFL). He made his AFL debut in Round 10, 2013, against  at the Gabba.

In 2009, at the age of 19, Martin caught the attention of recruiters following a breakout year playing in Melbourne's Eastern Football League for the Noble Park Football Club where he won the club's best & fairest award. Martin spent a further two seasons at Noble Park before joining Frankston in 2012, going on to win the club champion trophy in his first season.

In his first season at Collingwood, Martin played 4 senior games, scoring 6 goals, and also won the Joseph Wren Memorial Trophy as the best and fairest of Collingwood's VFL side. He repeated the feat in 2014, claiming a second consecutive Joseph Wren award after managing just two games for the senior side that season.

On 4 October 2014, Martin announced his departure from Collingwood and the AFL to return to the Noble Park Football Club in 2015 after deciding the full-time demands of professional sport were not for him.

References

External links

 

1990 births
Living people
Australian rules footballers from Victoria (Australia)
Collingwood Football Club players
Frankston Football Club players
Place of birth missing (living people)